Tripp Hill is a mountain located in Central New York region of New York north-northeast of Fly Creek.

References

Ovis
Ovis